Sotiris Mavromatis (born 21 February 1966) is a Greek retired football midfielder and later manager. He was a squad member for the 1988 UEFA European Under-21 Championship and was capped once for Greece.

References

1966 births
Living people
Greek footballers
Super League Greece players
PAOK FC players
Olympiacos F.C. players
Paniliakos F.C. players
Athinaikos F.C. players
Greece under-21 international footballers
Greece international footballers
Greek football managers
Paniliakos F.C. managers
Acharnaikos F.C. managers
Panegialios F.C. managers
Association football midfielders
Footballers from Alexandroupolis